The Shangqiu railway station  is a railway station on Longhai railway and Xuzhou–Lanzhou high-speed railway in Shangqiu, Henan, China.

History
The history of the station dates back to 1912, when the French engineers responsible for route selection of the Kaifeng–Xuzhou section of Longhai railway began site survey just outside the north city gate of Guide (now Shangqiu). Since local gentries strongly opposed to the station site for the reason of Feng shui, the site of the station was moved about 7.5 km north and was named as Zhuji railway station. The station became operational in 1915, with the completion of the Kaifeng–Xuzhou railway

The name of the station was later changed to Guide railway station, after the former name of Shangqiu, and Shangqiu County railway station. It was changed to its current name in 1933.

The station was expanded and renovated for the opening of Xuzhou–Lanzhou high-speed railway in 2016, with a new north station building.

Future development 
The station is planned to be connected with the Shangqiu–Hangzhou high-speed railway and Beijing–Shangqiu high-speed railway in the future.

References

Railway stations in Henan
Stations on the Xuzhou–Lanzhou High-Speed Railway
Stations on the Longhai Railway
Railway stations in China opened in 1915